Saropogon dispar is a species of robber flies (insects in the family Asilidae).

Zoologists have reported seeing this species at Natches Pond, Fort Sill Oklahoma. Photographers have also observed larger specimens in Jefferson County. They found that the Jefferson County Saropogons were at flowering buttonbushes and were also picking off insects.

In Texas Saropogon dispar is the most injurious species of robber fly; they frequent apiaries. A bee keeper destroyed more than 700 of these flies in a single bee yard in a three-day period.

References

Asilidae
Articles created by Qbugbot
Insects described in 1902